In mathematics — specifically, in probability theory — the concentration dimension of a Banach space-valued random variable is a numerical measure of how "spread out" the random variable is compared to the norm on the space.

Definition

Let (B, || ||) be a Banach space and let X be a Gaussian random variable taking values in B.  That is, for every linear functional ℓ in the dual space B∗, the real-valued random variable 〈ℓ, X〉 has a normal distribution.  Define

Then the concentration dimension d(X) of X is defined by

Examples

 If B is n-dimensional Euclidean space Rn with its usual Euclidean norm, and X is a standard Gaussian random variable, then σ(X) = 1 and E[||X||2] = n, so d(X) = n.
 If B is Rn with the supremum norm, then σ(X) = 1 but E[||X||2] (and hence d(X)) is of the order of log(n).

References
.
.

Dimension
Statistical randomness